Włodzimierz is a Polish variant of the Slavic name Vladimir. 
The name may refer to:

List of people with the given name Włodzimierz
Włodzimierz Cimoszewicz (born 1950), Polish politician
Włodzimierz Czarniak (1934–1964), Polish alpine skier
Włodzimierz Kuperberg (born 1941), Polish mathematics research in geometry and topology
Włodzimierz Dzieduszycki (1825–1899), Polish noble (szlachcic), landowner, naturalist, political activist, collector and patron of arts
Włodzimierz Kotoński (1925–2014), Polish composer
Włodzimierz Krzyżanowski (1824–1887), Polish military leader and a brigade commander in the Union Army during the American Civil War
Wlodzimierz Ksiazek (1951–2011), contemporary New England painter
Włodzimierz Lubański (born 1947), Polish football player
Włodzimierz Perzyński (1877–1930), Polish writer and dramatist
Włodzimierz Schmidt (born 1943), Polish chess grandmaster
Włodzimierz Smolarek (1957–2012), retired Polish football player
Włodzimierz Sokorski (1908–1999), Polish communist activist, writer, military journalist and eventually a Brigadier General
Włodzimierz Tetmajer (1861–1923), Polish painter
Włodzimierz Zawadzki (born 1967), Polish wrestler

See also
Vladimir (name)
Włodzimierz (disambiguation)

External links
Włodzimierz at Behind The Name

Polish masculine given names
Slavic masculine given names